The Blohm & Voss BV 144 was an advanced twin-engined commercial airliner developed by Germany during World War II but intended for post-war service. It was unusual in having a variable-incidence wing. Two prototypes were built by Breguet in France.

Design
The BV 144 was an all-metal cantilever monoplane of broadly conventional layout with a high wing and twin tail fins. It had a crew of three and was intended to carry 18 to 23 passengers.

A unique feature of the BV 144 was the variable-incidence wing. The wing mechanism had already been test flown on an Ha 140 floatplane. Combined on the BV 144 with a tricycle (nosewheel) landing gear, which was also still unusual in those days, it ensured the comfort of the passengers by maintaining a level fuselage during takeoff and also allowing the fuselage to sit low to the ground for ease of boarding. An electro-mechanical device rotated the wing by its main spar, up to 9°.

The BV 144 was powered by two wing-mounted BMW 801 MA radial engines.

History
In 1940 the airline Deutsche Luft Hansa approached Blohm & Voss to design and build a twin-engined airliner, to be introduced after the war. Blohm & Voss developed the BV 144 to meet the requirement. At the time the war was going in Germany's favour and planning for post-war services was reasonable.

B&V had no production capacity for peacetime projects, so Ernst Udet suggested that it could be built by the French company Breguet, based in Bordeaux, who at that time had no work on. Breguet's designers went to work in the B&V offices to complete the detail design work.

Two aircraft were completed near the end of the war, but by then Germany was in retreat and at least one machine was given French Air Force markings. It is said that for a while President Charles de Gaulle used one as his private aircraft.

Specifications (BV 144 V1)

References

Notes

Bibliography

External links

http://www.warbirdsresourcegroup.org/LRG/bv144.html

BV 144
Cancelled aircraft projects
1940s German airliners
Variable-incidence-wing aircraft
BV 144